L'Islet is a municipality within L'Islet Regional County Municipality in the Chaudière-Appalaches region of Quebec, Canada.

It is located on the south shore of the Saint Lawrence River halfway between Quebec City and Rivière-du-Loup. The Musée Maritime du Québec (Quebec Marine Museum) is located there on Route 132.

History and geography
The current town of L'Islet was formed in 2000 with the merger of the former city of L'Islet, the municipality of L'Islet-sur-Mer, and the parish municipality of Saint-Eugène.

The municipality got its name from a small island in the river near the village of L'Islet-sur-Mer.

The Notre-Dame-de-Bonsecours church, built 1768, is classified as important historical building.

The town hosts many small events during the year such as the Festival Guitares en fête, La Parades des Berlots, and the L'Islet Car Show.

Local rivers include the:
 Tortue River
 Bras St-Nicolas River
 Talbot River

Notable people

 Adine Fafard-Drolet, singer and founder of a music school
 Louis Pierre Blanchet, founder of St. Charles, Missouri USA in 1769.
 Xavier Bourgault,  junior ice hockey forward drafted to the Edmonton Oilers of the National Hockey League during the 2021 NHL Entry Draft.

See also
 List of municipalities in Quebec

References

External links
 
  Official website

Municipalities in Quebec
Incorporated places in Chaudière-Appalaches
Designated places in Quebec